Ana Gloria Moya (1954 – 7 October 2013) was an Argentine novelist who has achieved national and international recognition.

Her novel Cielo de tambores (Heaven of Drums) won the international Sor Juana Inés de la Cruz Prize in 2002. It is a historical novel based on the life of Manuel Belgrano with two characters from the margins of society.

Born in Tucuman, Moya worked as a lawyer in the northwestern province of Salta.

Books
 Sangre tan caliente - y otras pasiones (1997)
 La desmemoria (1999) Salta: Ediciones del Robledal, 
 Cielo de tambores (2002) - tr. Nick Hill, Sky of Drums, Curbstone Press (paperback 2006), 
Semillas de papaya a la luz de la luna. 2008. Emecé editorial.

Notes

External links
 Formal recognition by Argentine National Congress, April 2003 - in Spanish
 Primer Premio Certamen Literario Benito Crivelli 2001, Pro Cultura Salta - in Spanish

Argentine women novelists
1954 births
2013 deaths
20th-century Argentine novelists
20th-century Argentine women writers
20th-century Argentine writers